Seeley is a census-designated place (CDP) in Imperial County, California. The population was 1,823 at the 2010 census, up from 1,624 in 2000. It is part of the El Centro Metropolitan Area.

History
The first post office at Seeley was opened in 1909. The name honors Henry Seeley, an early developer of Imperial County.

Seeley is one of the oldest established communities in Imperial County, tracing its history back to the early years of the 20th century.  It was originally established as a stage stop on the shores of the now dead Blue Lake.

NAF El Centro, the winter home of the Blue Angels, was built adjacent to Seeley in 1946. In 1964, Interstate 8 was run a mile south of Seeley, marking the lowest elevation on the Interstate Highway System at -52 feet.

Geography
Bordered on the west by the New River, Seeley sits astride the Imperial Fault and above what was once the basin of the "Blue Lake". Like much of the Imperial Valley, Seeley lies entirely below sea level.

Climate
This area has a large amount of sunshine year round due to its stable descending air and high pressure.  According to the Köppen Climate Classification system, Seeley has a desert climate, abbreviated "Bwh" on climate maps.

Demographics

2010
The 2010 United States Census reported that Seeley had a population of 1,823. The racial makeup of Seeley was 746 (42.9%) White, 19 (1.1%) African American, 7 (0.4%) Native American, 21 (1.2%) Asian, 2 (0.1%) Pacific Islander, 793 (45.6%) from other races, and 151 (8.7%) from two or more races. Hispanic or Latino of any race were 1,489 persons (85.6%).

The Census reported that 1,823 people (100% of the population) lived in households, 0 (0%) lived in non-institutionalized group quarters, and 0 (0%) were institutionalized.

There were 493 households, out of which 276 (56.0%) had children under the age of 18 living in them, 268 (54.4%) were opposite-sex married couples living together, 114 (23.1%) had a female householder with no husband present, 28 (5.7%) had a male householder with no wife present.  There were 40 (8.1%) unmarried opposite-sex partnerships, and 2 (0.4%) same-sex married couples or partnerships. 66 households (13.4%) were made up of individuals, and 27 (5.5%) had someone living alone who was 65 years of age or older. The average household size was 3.53.  There were 410 families (83.2% of all households); the average family size was 3.83.

The population was spread out, with 577 people (33.2%) under the age of 18, 195 people (11.2%) aged 18 to 24, 421 people (24.2%) aged 25 to 44, 373 people (21.4%) aged 45 to 64, and 173 people (9.9%) who were 65 years of age or older.  The median age was 28.5 years. For every 100 females, there were 95.4 males.  For every 100 females age 18 and over, there were 85.3 males.

The homeowner vacancy rate was 5.3%; the rental vacancy rate was 10.5%.  892 people (51.3% of the population) lived in owner-occupied housing units and 847 people (48.7%) lived in rental housing units.

2000
As of the census of 2000, there were 1,624 people, 438 households, and 382 families residing in the CDP. The racial makeup of the CDP was 54.7% White, 0.7% Black or African American, 1.0% Native American, 2.3% Asian, 0.1% Pacific Islander, 35.9% from other races, and 5.2% from two or more races.  81.5% of the population were Hispanic or Latino of any race.

There were 438 households, out of which 54.8% had children under the age of 18 living with them, 66.4% were married couples living together, 16.4% had a female householder with no husband present, and 12.6% were non-families. 9.8% of all households were made up of individuals, and 4.8% had someone living alone who was 65 years of age or older.  The average household size was 3.7 and the average family size was 4.0.

In the CDP, the population was spread out, with 38.2% under the age of 18, 8.7% from 18 to 24, 28.8% from 25 to 44, 17.1% from 45 to 64, and 7.1% who were 65 years of age or older.  The median age was 27 years. For every 100 females, there were 96.6 males.  For every 100 females age 18 and over, there were 88.2 males.

The median income for a household in the CDP was $31,058, and the median income for a family was $31,667. Males had a median income of $28,654 versus $20,625 for females. The per capita income for the CDP was $9,539.  About 22.2% of families and 26.3% of the population were below the poverty line, including 36.0% of those under age 18 and 18.0% of those age 65 or over.

Politics

Infrastructure
Seeley County Water District, a special district, provides water and sewer service to Seeley.

California Historical Landmark
Near Seeley is California Historical Landmark number 1008, Yuha Well. Juan Bautista de Anza visited the well on March 8, 1774.  

The California Historical Landmark marker reads:

See also
 San Diego–Imperial, California
 El Centro Metropolitan Area
California Historical Landmarks in Imperial County
 Spanish missions in Arizona
Spanish missions in the Sonoran Desert
Spanish missions in Baja California
California Historical Landmark

References

Census-designated places in Imperial County, California
El Centro metropolitan area
Imperial Valley
Populated places in the Colorado Desert
Census-designated places in California